The 1907–08 Illinois Fighting Illini men's basketball team represented the University of Illinois.

Regular season
The 1907–08 season saw the third coach in three years take the reins at the University of Illinois.  Fletcher Lane was Illinois’ third coach, but lasted just one season. Even though he led his team to a 20–6 record, the university, as well as the athletes, deemed Lane's coaching style as subpar. Lane's team benefited from a long Southern trip in which the team beat several YMCA and club teams from Tennessee, Texas, Alabama, and Georgia. The starting lineup consisted of forwards Albert Penn and H. J. Popperfuss, center Avery Brundage, and guards Thomas E. Thompson and captain M. G. Dadant.

Roster

Source

Schedule
												
Source																

|-	
!colspan=12 style="background:#DF4E38; color:white;"| Non-Conference regular season
|- align="center" bgcolor=""

					

					

|-
!colspan=9 style="background:#DF4E38; color:#FFFFFF;"|Big Ten regular season

|-													

Bold Italic connotes conference game

Awards and honors
 First 20 win season for the Fighting Illini men's basketball program.

References

Illinois Fighting Illini
Illinois Fighting Illini men's basketball seasons
1907 in sports in Illinois
1908 in sports in Illinois